Dorcadion cephalotes is a species of beetle in the family Cerambycidae. It was described by Jakovlev in 1890.

See also 
Dorcadion

References

cephalotes
Beetles described in 1890